Locks Farm Meadow is a  Site of special scientific interest which just east of Porchfield, England. The site was notified in 1988 for its biological features.

References

Natural England citation sheet

Sites of Special Scientific Interest on the Isle of Wight
Meadows in the Isle of Wight